121 (one hundred [and] twenty-one) is the natural number following 120 and preceding 122.

In mathematics

One hundred [and] twenty-one is 
 a square (11 times 11)
 the sum of the powers of 3 from 0 to 4, so a repunit in ternary. Furthermore, 121 is the only square of the form , where p is prime (3, in this case).
 the sum of three consecutive prime numbers (37 + 41 + 43).
 As , it provides a solution to Brocard's problem. There are only two other squares known to be of the form . Another example of 121 being one of the few numbers supporting a conjecture is that Fermat conjectured that 4 and 121 are the only perfect squares of the form  (with  being 2 and 5, respectively).
 It is also a star number, a centered tetrahedral number, and a centered octagonal number.

 In decimal, it is a Smith number since its digits add up to the same value as its factorization (which uses the same digits) and as a consequence of that it is a Friedman number. But it cannot be expressed as the sum of any other number plus that number's digits, making 121 a self number.

In other fields

121 is also:
 The electricity emergency telephone number in Egypt
 The number for voicemail for mobile phones on the Vodafone network
 The undiscovered chemical element unbiunium has the atomic number 121
 The official end score for cribbage
 The pennant number of RTS Moskva, the Russian Navy’s Black Sea flagship, which was damaged beyond repair on April 13, 2022.

See also
 List of highways numbered 121
 United States House of Representatives House Resolution 121
 United Nations Security Council Resolution 121

References

Integers